Dušan Kožíšek (born 25 April 1983 in Jilemnice) is a Czech cross-country skier who has been competing since 2002. He won a bronze medal in the team sprint (with Martin Koukal) at the 2005 FIS Nordic World Ski Championships in Oberstdorf and finished 38th in the individual sprint in those same games. Kožíšek repeated the success in the team sprint at the 2007 FIS Nordic World Ski Championships in Sapporo when he won a bronze medal, this time with Milan Šperl. Kožíšek also finished 17th in the individual sprint at those same games.

Kožíšek's best individual finish at the Winter Olympics was 22nd in the individual sprint in 2006. He has two career victories (2004, 2005) in distances up to 15 km.

Cross-country skiing results
All results are sourced from the International Ski Federation (FIS).

Olympic Games

World Championships
 2 medals – (2 bronze)

World Cup

Season standings

Individual podiums
 1 podium – (1 )

References

External links
 
  

1983 births
Cross-country skiers at the 2006 Winter Olympics
Cross-country skiers at the 2010 Winter Olympics
Cross-country skiers at the 2014 Winter Olympics
Czech male cross-country skiers
Living people
Olympic cross-country skiers of the Czech Republic
FIS Nordic World Ski Championships medalists in cross-country skiing
People from Jilemnice
Sportspeople from the Liberec Region